The Magician's Palm is a method for hiding a playing card, in which the card is placed in the hand lengthwise, the hand is curled inward slightly, and the card is thus retained in the hand.  It is important with this palm that you do not have one's thumb sticking out as if "hitchhiking" as this is a "tell" or sign that a card is being palmed.

References 

Card tricks